is located in Kyoto, Japan and houses a large collection of Chinese bronze vessels, Chinese and Japanese mirrors, and a few Chinese bronze Buddhist figures. The collection was brought together by Sumitomo Kichizaemon VII before his death in 1926. It is credited with being one of the greatest collections of Asian bronzes in the world due to the collection's quality and the variety of its more than 500 pieces.

See also
List of National Treasures of Japan (paintings)
List of National Treasures of Japan (crafts-others)

References

External links
 Museum website (in English)
 About visiting the museum (in English)

Museums in Kyoto
Art museums and galleries in Japan